Arlett Tovar Gómez (born 9 May 1997), known as Arlett Tovar, is a Mexican professional footballer who plays as a defender for Guadalajara (commonly known as Chivas) in the Liga MX Femenil, the first professional women's football (soccer) league in Mexico.

In 2017, she scored two goals (a brace) in the final to help Chivas win the first professional women's soccer championship in the country in front of 32,466 spectators. Tovar has represented Mexico on the under-17 and under-20 national teams.

Playing career

Club

Guadalajara, 2017–
Tovar scored a header goal in the 36th minute of the final game of the championship final to help Chivas win 3–0 over Pachuca. She and her teammates were honored by the Governor of Jalisco the following month. The President of Mexico congratulated the team via Twitter.

International
Tovar has represented Mexico on the under-17 national team. She competed at the 2013 CONCACAF Women's U-17 Championship held in Jamaica and helped the team finish in first place after defeating the United States in penalty kicks. Tovar scored one of the penalties. With the win, Mexico secured their placement at the 2014 FIFA U-17 Women's World Cup.

Honors and achievements

Club
Guadalajara
 Liga MX Femenil: Apertura 2017

Individual
 Liga MX Femenil Team of The Season: Apertura 2017

Notes

References

External links
 
 Arlett Tovar at C.D. Guadalajara Femenil 
 
 

1997 births
Living people
Mexican women's footballers
Footballers from Guadalajara, Jalisco
Liga MX Femenil players
C.D. Guadalajara (women) footballers
Deportivo Toluca F.C. (women) footballers
Mexico women's youth international footballers
Women's association football defenders
Mexican footballers